Guiomar Madalena de Sá e Vilhena (1705-1789), was a Portuguese businessperson.

She inherited a major shipping company in Madeira from her father and childless brother in 1766 and became an important member of the history of the island, dominating in financial affairs for decades.

References

1705 births
1789 deaths
18th-century Portuguese businesspeople
Madeiran businesspeople
Ship owners